The Saffman–Delbrück model describes a lipid membrane as a thin layer of viscous fluid, surrounded by a less viscous bulk liquid.  This picture was originally proposed to determine the diffusion coefficient of membrane proteins, but has also been used to describe the dynamics of fluid domains within lipid membranes. The Saffman–Delbrück formula is often applied to determine the size of an object embedded in a membrane from its observed diffusion coefficient, and is characterized by the weak logarithmic dependence of diffusion constant on object radius.

Origin
In a three-dimensional highly viscous liquid, a spherical object of radius a has diffusion coefficient

 

by the well-known Stokes–Einstein relation. By contrast, the diffusion coefficient of a circular object embedded in a two-dimensional fluid diverges; this is Stokes' paradox. In a real lipid membrane, the diffusion coefficient may be limited by:

 the size of the membrane
 the inertia of the membrane (finite Reynolds number)
 the effect of the liquid surrounding the membrane

Philip Saffman and Max Delbrück calculated the diffusion coefficient for these three cases, and showed that Case 3 was the relevant effect.

Saffman–Delbrück formula
The diffusion coefficient of a cylindrical inclusion of radius  in a membrane with thickness  and viscosity , surrounded by bulk fluid with viscosity  is:

 

This result is an approximation applicable for radii , which is appropriate for proteins ( nm), but not for micrometre-scale lipid domains.

The Saffman–Delbrück formula predicts that diffusion coefficients  will only depend weakly on the size of the embedded object; for example, if , changing  from 1 nm to 10 nm only reduces the diffusion coefficient  by 30%.

Beyond the Saffman–Delbrück length

 

A useful formula that produces the correct diffusion coefficients between these two limits is 

 

Experimental studies
However, for larger objects (such as micrometre-scale lipid domains), the Saffman–Delbruck model (with the extensions above) is well-established

Extending Saffman–Delbrück for Hydrodynamic Coupling of Proteins within Curved Lipid Bilayer Membranes 
The Saffman–Delbrück approach has also been extended in recent works for modeling hydrodynamic interactions between proteins embedded within curved lipid bilayer membranes, such as in vesicles and other structures.  These works use related formulations to study the roles of the membrane hydrodynamic coupling and curvature in the collective drift-diffusion dynamics of proteins within bilayer membranes.  Various models of the protein inclusions within curved membranes have been developed, including models based on series truncations, immersed boundary methods, and fluctuating hydrodynamics.

References

Biophysics
Proteins
Membrane biology